Events from the year 1902 in China.

Incumbents 
 Guangxu Emperor (23rd year)

Events 
 signing of the Mackay Treaty — a sixteen article treaty signed by the governments of Great Britain and the Chinese Qing dynasty on 5 September 1902. Under the terms of the treaty, the likin system of taxation was abolished and the first moves made to abolish extraterritoriality for foreign nationals.

Births 
 7 May — Guo Tianmin (郭天民, 1902 – 1970) was a general in the People's Liberation Army of the People's Republic of China from Hubei

References